Dayton (formerly, Day Town and Grainland) is an unincorporated town in Butte County, California. It lies south of Chico at an elevation of 141 feet (43 m).

History 
The town began in 1859 with the arrival of Samuel Van Ness and Joseph Wiggins, who set up a trading post there. Other shops followed.
A post office (named Grainland) was established in 1867 and closed later that year; it was reopened in 1873, closed again in 1892, reopened in 1893, and closed for good in 1902. Presently it gets postal service from Chico. While initially an important grain shipping point, it was eclipsed when the railroad was put through elsewhere.

Government 

References

Unincorporated communities in California
Unincorporated communities in Butte County, California